Sansarc Creek is a stream in the U.S. state of South Dakota.

The stream was named for the Sansarc Sioux Indians.

See also
List of rivers of South Dakota

References

Rivers of Stanley County, South Dakota
Rivers of South Dakota